The Castells were a male vocal quartet from Santa Rosa, California best remembered for their hits "Sacred" (No. 20 in 1961) and "So This Is Love" (No. 21 in 1962), both released on Era Records. Their sound blended light rock with elements of collegiate vocal harmony and jazz.

History
The Castells were formed at Santa Rosa High School around 1959. They were booked for a performance at a local teenage "canteen". They did not have a name and their pianist, Jeff Bush, suggested one. It had no meaning other than they thought that it sounded good, and the intent was to be more thoughtful and change it later.

Through a Santa Rosa KJAX disc jockey who went by the name of Dan Dillon, they got Hollywood contacts. Chuck Girard's mother financed a demo for a hundred dollars, which was recorded in a San Francisco studio. They took their demo and went door-to-door in Hollywood, first to Crystalette Records, which seemed to be defunct, Aladdin Records, and then Era Records. They were excited that Aladdin seemed interested, as they considered themselves to be R&B, but eventually it was Era who signed them.

Their first release "Little Sad Eyes", went to "Bubbling Under" on the Billboard chart, then came "Sacred", which reached the charts.,peaking at #20 in the early summer of 1961. "Make Believe Wedding" went "Bubbling Under", then "So This Is Love" again charted, reaching #21 in the spring of 1962. They played shows for a few years, and shared the stage with Jackie Wilson, Jerry Lee Lewis, Bobby Vee, and Brenda Lee. They never charted again but did continue to record for a few years, first for Warner Bros. Records and then Decca Records. They disbanded around 1964. Chuck Girard later joined the surf rock group The Hondells and, in the 1970s, became a popular CCM artist.

Members

The band's original members were Chuck Girard, Tom Hicks, Warren Hays, Bob Ussery, and Jeff Bush. Bush did not sing, but played piano on all the gigs. Hays left when the group was signed by Era Records. The group planned to move from Santa Rosa to southern California. Hays, a minor, was not allowed to move with the boys, and his parents also objected on religious grounds. When Hays left, Joe Kelly replaced him. When the group signed with Era Records, label president Herb Newman insisted on session pianists, and Jeff Bush was edged out.

In 1963 Bob Ussery got married, left the group, and moved out of California. He was temporarily replaced by Greg Van Krugel, Chuck Girard's roommate and high school friend, because he knew the material from attending rehearsals. After a few live performances as a substitute, he was elected to permanent membership. By late 1964, The Castells were still recording and doing public appearances, but their popularity was waning. By 1965 the group members remained friends but went their separate ways.

Most often produced by Gary Usher, Chuck Girard and Joe Kelly went on to record as a duo under their real names, Chuck and Joe, recording blue-eyed soul covers of earlier popular songs like "Harlem Shuffle" and "Feel So Fine." They recorded a few edgy pop-folk singles as the Devons. They worked for Usher for several years and recorded a number of hot rod and surf albums under many different group identities.

Tom Hicks began a family with a new wife and went on to become a successful businessman in southern California.

Greg Van Krugel also married. He was drafted into the U.S. Army in 1966. In 1968, after active duty, he returned to his wife and daughter in southern California and made his career in the defense and aerospace electronics industry.

Other performers of note with whom the Castells shared the stage include Bobby Rydell, Dick and Dee Dee, Jan and Dean, The Beach Boys, The Righteous Brothers. The Rivingtons, Donnie Brooks, Dobie Gray, Gary Lewis & The Playboys, Ted Neely and Larry Verne.

Session musicians the Castells worked with later became known as The Wrecking Crew. They included Billy Strange (guitar), Barney Kessel (guitar), Ray Pohlman (bass and arranger of one of the group's sessions), Frankie Capp, Plas Johnson (saxophone), Glen Campbell (guitar), and Hal Blaine (drums).

Partial discography
A: "Little Sad Eyes" B: "Romeo" (1961)
A: "Sacred" B: "I Get Dreamy" (1961) #20 on Billboard Hot 100
A: "Make Believe Wedding" B: "My Miracle" (1961) #98 on Bilboard Hot 100
A: "So This Is Love" B: "On the Street of Tears" (1962) #21 on Billboard Hot 100
A: "Oh! What It Seemed to Be" B: "Stand There Mountain" (1962) #91 on Billboard Hot 100
A: "Life Goes On" B: "I Thought You'd Like That" (1966)

References

External links
 Chuck Girard's official website

Musical groups from California
Era Records artists